HMP Bedford is a Category B men's prison, located in the Harpur area of Bedford, Bedfordshire, England. The prison is operated by His Majesty's Prison Service.

History
The prison has been on its current site since 1801 and was designed by the architect John Wing (1756-1826), who also designed the Bedford town bridge, the Infirmary and the House of Industry. The previous site was on the corner of the High Street and Silver Street, then known as Gaol Lane. The location is marked with a plaque in the pavement due to its connection with John Bunyan, being the probable place where he wrote The Pilgrim's Progress. Wing's original building included "...a turnkey's lodge, cells for debtors, felons and house of correction prisoners, hot and cold baths and an oven to purify infected clothing. The silence system was enforced with great severity, wooden partitions being placed between any two prisoners at work on the treadmill. Separate exercise was allowed in the yards, and meals were taken in the cells." The prison has been twice expanded, in 1849 and 1990.

In December 2009, the prison's own Independent Monitoring Board issued a report citing concerns over the high number of prisoners serving life sentences being held at Bedford. The report praised mental healthcare provision and highlighted staff morale, prisoners' property and the visits booking line of the prison. It also praised levels of respect between staff and inmates at the jail, along with the prison's food provision and hygiene standards.

In June 2010, Donna Stanton, aged 27, a female prison officer from Bedford, was convicted after it emerged that she had a sexual relationship with an inmate from the gaol. The prison officer had also smuggled a mobile phone, food, tobacco and newspapers into the prison for the inmate while he served his sentence. She was jailed for two years.

In September 2012, it was revealed that Bedford Prison had the highest suicide rate of any prison in England and Wales during 2011/12. Four inmates committed suicide at the prison during this period, out of a population of 465.

In November 2016 riot police and emergency services were called to a prisoner riot at the facility.

The prison today
Bedford is a local prison holding Category B male prisoners who have been remanded from Luton Crown Court and all magistrates' courts in Bedfordshire. The term 'local' means that the prison holds people on remand to the local courts, as well as sentenced prisoners.

There is a split regime operating within the prison, offering work and education on a part-time basis. There is a resettlement unit within the prison, a daily library provision, and gymnasium available. The prison hosts a healthcare centre with 12 beds and 24-hour health care coverage, while those prisoners who may be at risk from suicide or self-harm are provided a prisoner listener scheme.

The Ormiston Children and Families Trust runs the Visitors Centre, which features wheelchair access, a children's play area with supervised play activity and baby changing facilities. Two Quiet Gardens, affiliated to The Quiet Garden Trust, have been established inside the prison for quiet contemplation and prayer for both prisoners and staff.

Michael Berry, 24, was the eighth prisoner to kill himself since 2017.  Berry told staff he found it hard to ignore voices in his head telling him to kill himself but despite this no GP saw him and anti psychotic medication was not prescribed for Berry.  The Prison and Probation Ombudsman said that, "significant issues remain" in mental health service provision at Bedford Prison.

Bedford Prison is overcrowded, inspection revealed 495 prisoners while the certified capacity is just 322.

Riot
On Sunday 6 November 2016, there was a riot in Bedford prison with 200 prisoners protesting against lockdowns due to staff shortages. Prisoners claim accessing drugs is easier than accessing clothing or bedding in the prison.  Basics like soap and toilet paper were not consistently supplied.  The Independent Monitoring Board at Bedford said that prisoners were not treated humanely before the riot.  The numbers claiming they developed a drug problem while in the prison rose from 4% to 14%.  The Prison Officers Association has been warning for some time about the risk of violence in British prisons.  Her Majesty's Prison inspection in May 2016 found poor physical conditions and stated, “Arrangements for managing violent and bullying behaviour and supporting victims were weak.”  The riot caused £1 million damage.
The Howard League for Penal Reform stated officers refused to unlock prisoners when it was considered too risky.  Andrew Neilson of the campaign said:

This is one of four serious incident within under two months, Riots also happened at Birmingham Prison, Lewes Prison and Swaleside Prison.

Following the riot
In May 2018 inspectors found the prison was making insufficient progress and Bedford Prison was put into special measures.  In September 2018 Peter Clarke activated the urgent notification protocol because inspectors had found high levels of violence and inexperienced staff having difficulty maintaining control.  Clarke wrote, “The clear view of the inspectorate is that immediate and decisive intervention is needed at HMP Bedford to avert further decline and an even more dangerous lack of control than is currently the case.  It is of great concern that for seven years the prison has been on a path of seemingly inexorable decline. Repeated inspection findings clearly show that this has been the case. For much of that time there was a marked inconsistency in the leadership of the prison, with frequent changes of governor.”  Prisoners were effectively in control choosing when to comply with authority, and regularly breaking rules.  There was a smell of drugs in all wings, 3 in 5 prisoners admitted developing a drug habit since getting into the prison, there was a rat and cockroach infestation.  There were 116 assaults on staff during the 6 months to September 2018.  Living conditions were bad and overcrowded and there was insufficient purposeful activity for prisoners.

Notable former inmates
 John Bunyan – author of The Pilgrim's Progress, convicted for unlicensed preaching.
 Ahmed Ali Awan - convicted of the racially motivated murder of Ross Parker.
 Sarah Dazley - poisoner, hanged in 1843.
 James Hanratty - eighth to last person in Britain to be executed for murder. Hanged Wednesday, 4 April 1962.
 Alfred Rouse - hanged Tuesday, 10 March 1931, for the Blazing car murder at Hardingstone which attracted sensational national interest. Rouse was tried at Northampton Assizes.

References

External links
History of Bedford Prison from theprison.org.uk
Ministry of Justice pages on HMP Bedford
HMP Bedford - HM Inspectorate of Prisons Reports

Prison
Category B prisons in England
Prisons in Bedfordshire
1801 establishments in England
Men's prisons